Christopher Mark Battarbee (born 11 April 1975) is a former English first-class cricketer.

Born at Sidcup in April 1975, Battarbee attended Keble College, Oxford. While studying at Oxford, he played first-class cricket for Oxford University in 1997, making seven appearances. Playing as a right-arm medium pace bowler, he took 11 wickets at an average of 57.00, with best figures of 2 for 56. After graduating from Oxford, Battarbee became a schoolteacher. He is the current head of geography at Tonbridge School.

References

External links

1975 births
Living people
People from Sidcup
Alumni of Keble College, Oxford
English cricketers
Oxford University cricketers
Schoolteachers from Kent